NVC Community M25 (Molinia caerulea - Potentilla erecta mire)is one of the 38 mire communities in the British National Vegetation Classification system.

Community Composition

The following species are found in this community

  Molinia caerulea
  Potentilla erecta

References

 JNCC Report  No. 394  The European context of British Lowland Grasslands  J.S. Rodwell1, V. Morgan2, R.G. Jefferson3 & D. Moss4  February 2007  JNCC, Peterborough 2007 |http://jncc.defra.gov.uk/pdf/jncc394_webpt2v2.pdf

M25
Molinia caerulea Potentilla erecta
erecta, NVC